The following is a list of progressive metal artists, bands and groups. This list contains some bands that at least at some point during their career played progressive metal. Rooted in the early 1980s, the genre fused mellow progressive rock with a heavy metal aesthetic. Characteristics may include complex song structures, unusual time signatures, lengthy songs and often using concept albums.

Later on, many extreme metal bands began to experiment and developed an array of progressive metal fusions with other genres, including death metal, black metal, thrash metal and avant-garde metal.

0-9 
 3
 10 Years

A 

 Adagio
 Aeon Zen
 After Forever
 Agalloch
 Age of Nemesis
 Aghora
 Akercocke
 Aletheian
 Alchemist
 Alter Bridge
 Amorphis
 Amoral
 Anacrusis
 Angband
 Angra
 Animals as Leaders
 Anubis Gate
 Atheist
 August Burns Red
 Avenged Sevenfold
 Ayreon
 Azusa

B 

 Balance of Power
 Baroness
 Becoming the Archetype
 Believer
 Benevolent
 Benea Reach
 Between the Buried and Me
 Beyond Twilight
 Bigelf
 Biomechanical
 The Black Mages
 Blind Illusion
 Borknagar
 Burst

C 

 Cacophony
 Caligula's Horse
 Candiria
 Cattle Decapitation
 Carbonized
 Circus Maximus
CloudScape
 Confessor
 Communic
 Coheed and Cambria
 Conception
 Coroner
 Crimson Glory
 Cronian
 Cynic

D 

 Dark Suns
 DBC
 Death (later)
 The Dillinger Escape Plan
 Deus Invictus
 Dir En Grey (later)
 Distorted Harmony
 Dog Fashion Disco
 Dream Theater
 Dysrhythmia

E 

 Echoes of Eternity
 Edge of Sanity
 Enchant
 Enslaved
 Epica
 Evergrey
 Extol

F 

 The Faceless
 Fates Warning
 Frameshift

G 

 Galactic Cowboys
 Gojira
 Grief of Emerald

H 

 Haken
 Henceforth

I 

 Iced Earth
 Iron Maiden
 Isis

J 

 Job for a Cowboy

K 

 Kalijuge
 Kamelot
 Katatonia
 Karnivool
 Katagory V
 Kekal
 Khallice
 King's X

L 

 Lance King
 Leah
 Leprous
 Liquid Tension Experiment
 Loathe
 Lotus Eater

M 

 Manticora
 Mastodon
 Mekong Delta
 Meshuggah
 Moonsorrow
 Mudvayne
 Muse
 Mutiny Within
 Myrath

N 

 Narnia
 Ne Obliviscaris
 Necrophagist
 Negură Bunget
 Nerverek
 Nevermore
 Nodes of Ranvier
 No Sin Evades His Gaze

O 

 Obliveon
 Obscura
 Oficina G3
 Opeth
 Orphaned Land

P 

 Pain of Salvation
 Pathosray
 Periphery
 Pestilence
 Planet X
 Platypus
 Porcupine Tree 
 Primus
 Prospect
 Protest the Hero
 Prototype
 Proyecto Eskhata
 Puya
 Pyramaze

Q 

 Queensrÿche
 Quo Vadis

R 

 Rage
 Realm
 Redemption
 Rhapsody of Fire
 Riverside 
 Royal Hunt
 Rusty Eye

S 

 Savatage
 Scale the Summit
 Sculptured
 Schaliach
 Seventh Wonder
 Shadow Gallery
 Derek Sherinian
 Sikth
 Sky Architect
 Sleepytime Gorilla Museum
 Sons of Apollo
 Spheric Universe Experience
 Spiral Architect
 Spock's Beard
 Steelscape
 Stolen Babies
 Stratovarius
 Symphony X
 System of a Down

T 

 Tangerine Circus
 Tesseract
 The Contortionist
 The Human Abstract
 Therion
 Threshold
 Tiamat
 Tool
 Tourniquet
 Toxicon
 Trivium
 Týr

U 
 Uriah Heep

V 

 Vanden Plas
 Vardøger
 Vektor (band)
 Vision Divine
 Vildhjarta
 Voivod
 VOLA

W 

 Waltari
 Warmen
 Watchtower
 Winger
 Without Face

X 

 Xysma

Z 

 Zero Hour

See also 

 Progressive metal
 Progressive rock
 Jazz fusion
 List of heavy metal bands

References 
 
 
 Christe, Ian (2003). Sound of the Beast: The Complete Headbanging History of Heavy Metal. HarperCollins. 
 ^ The Harvard Crimson "Bassist Chris Wolstenholme pens and sings a pair of tracks late in the game, and while they are fine pieces of progressive metal, his admittedly pleasing smooth voice lacks Bellamy's intense vibrato"

Notes 

Progressive metal
Progressive metal